Yung Suk Kim is a Korean-American biblical scholar. Kim is professor of New Testament and early Christianity at the Samuel DeWitt Proctor School of Theology (Virginia Union University). He studied in Korean and American schools. Kim obtained a PhD in New Testament studies from Vanderbilt University in 2006, an M.Div. from McCormick Theological Seminary in 1999, and a B.A. from Kyungpook National University in 1985. He is the editor of the Journal of Race, Ethnicity, and Religion.

Academic Works

Books

Edited books

References

External links
Society of Biblical Literature Society of Biblical Literature
Google Scholars Page Yung Suk Kim
WorldCat Author Profile Page: Kim, Yung Suk [WorldCat Identities]
Kim's Blog: Dr. Yung Suk Kim's Scholarship and Journey
 

New Testament scholars
Living people
American Christian theologians
Vanderbilt University alumni
McCormick Theological Seminary alumni
Kyungpook National University alumni
American people of Korean descent
American biblical scholars
Year of birth missing (living people)